Peter Carl Friedrich Geyer (1802–1889) was a German entomologist who wrote and illustrated various supplements to Jacob Hübner's works on Lepidoptera.

Carl Geyer was by profession an artist. He is not to be confused with Karl Andreas Geyer (1809–1853), a botanist and plant collector.

References

Evenhuis, N. L. 1997 Litteratura taxonomica dipterorum (1758–1930). Volume 1 (A-K); Volume 2 (L-Z). Leiden, Backhuys Publishers.

External links
Carl Geyer (1796–1841) mentioned in Jacob Hübner's biography: Neue Deutsche Biographie, vol. 9, 1972, p. 720 

German lepidopterists
1818 births
1852 deaths
19th-century German artists
19th-century German zoologists
Date of birth missing
Date of death missing